Gordonbrook is a rural locality in the South Burnett Region, Queensland, Australia. In the  Gordonbrook had a population of 175 people.

Geography 
Gordonbrook mainly consists of grazing land, with irrigated crops growing close to the banks of the Stuart River. The Stuart River dissects the locality, with the large artificial lake, the Lake Gordonbrook damming the river in the northern part of the district.  Very little of the area is developed with most of the land covered by bush and grazing land.  Reedy Creek, a tributary of Stuart River downstream of Gordonbrook Dam, is another major waterway in the locality.

History 
Although it was recommended that the settlers grow cotton, most took up dairying. By June 1923 there were 29 settlers in the scheme but by 1929 only 13 remained.

Gordon Brook Provisional School opened in 1924.  On 11 September 1928 Gordon Brook South Provisional School opened and both schools operated "half time" (the full-time teacher being split between them). In 1929, Gordon Brook Provisional School closed and Gordon Brook South Provisional School continued on a full-time basis.  On 1 October 1938 it became Gordon Brook South State School and then closed in 1945.

In 1941 Gordonbrook Dam was constructed to provide the town of Kingaroy and its former WWII airforce base, R.A.A.F Kingaroy with a reliable water supply. In 1986, the dam was extensively upgraded, including the raising of the dam wall and spillway by two metres.

Formerly in the Shire of Kingaroy, Gordonbrook was included in the newly formed South Burnett Region following the local government amalgamations in March 2008.

In the 2011 census, Gordonbrook had a population of 322 people.

In the  Gordonbrook had a population of 175 people.

Education 
There are no schools in Gordonbrook. The nearest primary schools are Crawford State School in neighbouring Crawford to the east, Kingaroy State School in neighbouring Kingaroy to the south-east, Kumbia State School in Kumbia to the south, Wooroolin State School in neighbouring Wooroolin to the north-east and Tingoora State School  in Tingoora to the north-east. The nearest secondary school is Kingaroy State High School in Kingaroy.

Economy 
There are a number of homesteads in the area, including:

 Brigadoon
 Brigadoon
 Gordonbrook
 Gunna Hafta
 Hillgrove
 Langfaulds
 Plain View
 Tamalba
 Wyuna

References

Further reading 
 Hession, Kathleen, Arthur, Jeannette. History of the Crawford district and of the Crawford State School from 1911 to 1961 and Crawford State School Crawford State School : 1911–2011 centenary 100 years. Crawford State School Centenary Committee, Crawford, Qld, 2011. — includes the history of Gordon Brook South State School.

South Burnett Region
Localities in Queensland